James Rainey Munro Mackay (9 September 1880 – 13 June 1953), better known as "Sunny Jim" Mackay, was an Australian cricketer. He was a right-handed opening batsman who was likened in his youth to Victor Trumper, and was considered unlucky to miss the 1905 Australian tour to England.
  
Mackay was born in Armidale, New South Wales.  He scored 203, 90, 194, 105, 102* and 136 for New South Wales in the 1905/06 season, as well as six centuries for his club side, Burwood.  Along with several other players he signed a contract with Melbourne Cricket Club to bring an English side to Australia and was suspended.

He moved to South Africa where, while working at a diamond mine, he scored 247 runs at 35.28 for Transvaal in 1906-07 and was only left out of the South African team to tour England in 1907 because it was felt that he had not spent long enough in the country. His eyesight was damaged when a motorbike knocked him down and his brief but dazzling career was cut short.

Mackay moved back to Sydney and tried to regain his place in the New South Wales side but his injury was too debilitating and he was forced to retire.  In just 20 first class matches from 1902/03 to 1906/07, he had scored 1556 runs at 50.19 with six hundreds and seven fifties.

He worked on farms in the New England region and died in Walcha.

References

External links

1880 births
1953 deaths
New South Wales cricketers
Gauteng cricketers
People from Armidale
Cricketers from New South Wales